Esteban Ciaccheri (born 20 May 1991 in Argentina) is an Argentine footballer who plays as a forward.

References

External links
 
 
 

1991 births
Living people
Argentine footballers
Argentine expatriate footballers
Association football forwards
Chilean Primera División players
Argentine Primera División players
Torneo Federal A players
Liga I players
Primera B Metropolitana players
Primera Nacional players
Rangers de Talca footballers
Club Atlético Sarmiento footballers
Juventud Unida Universitario players
Arsenal de Sarandí footballers
FC Botoșani players
ACS Poli Timișoara players
Flandria footballers
Deportivo Morón footballers
San Luis de Quillota footballers
Expatriate footballers in Chile
Argentine expatriate sportspeople in Chile
Expatriate footballers in Romania
Argentine expatriate sportspeople in Romania
Sportspeople from Buenos Aires Province